E. Jason Wambsgans is a photojournalist working for the Chicago Tribune. He was awarded the Pulitzer prize in Feature Photography for his portrait of gun violence in Chicago.

Early life
Wambsgans was born in Detroit and graduated from Central Michigan University.

Career
Wambsgans was one of three journalists awarded the Pulitzer Prize for Feature Photography in 2017.
Wambsgans' Pulitzer-winning piece followed a 10-year-old Chicago gunshot victim for three months, during which time Wambsgans developed a personal relationship with the child.

Wambsgans has worked at the Chicago Tribune as a staff photographer since 2002 and does photo stories reflecting events in, and around, the town. Wambsgans recently worked on a piece about US attorney Zachary Fardon, as he resigned from his position due to President Trump asking all 46 US attorneys that were under Obama to step down in a "uniform transition".
Aside from his work with the Chicago Tribune, Wambsgans runs an Instagram account dedicated to black-and-white photography captured on his cellphone.

References

External links
 Instagram feed

Year of birth missing (living people)
Living people
Pulitzer Prize for Feature Photography winners
People from Detroit
Journalists from Michigan